Michael Carmen Pitt (born April 10, 1981) is an American actor, model, and musician. Pitt is known in film for his roles in Murder by Numbers (2002), Bernardo Bertolucci's The Dreamers (2003), Gus Van Sant's Last Days (2005), and Michael Haneke's Funny Games (2007), and in television for his roles as Henry Parker in the teen drama Dawson's Creek (1999–2000), Jimmy Darmody in the HBO series Boardwalk Empire (2010–2011), and Mason Verger in the second season of the NBC series Hannibal (2014). He has also appeared in the films Hedwig and the Angry Inch (2001), Bully (2001), Silk (2007), Seven Psychopaths (2012), I Origins (2014), and Ghost in the Shell (2017).

Early life
Michael Carmen Pitt was born on April 10, 1981 in West Orange, New Jersey to Donald B. Pitt, an auto mechanic, and Eleanor Carol (née DeMaio) Pitt, a waitress. He has two older sisters and one older brother. Pitt is of Italian and Irish heritage on his mother's side, and of English descent on his father's. By age 16, Pitt had been to three or four different high schools, among them Morris Catholic High School, and was in "special classes" before ultimately dropping out. He also did a brief stint at the Essex County Youth House, a detention center.

Career

Film
In 2001, Pitt earned a breakout role as Tommy Gnosis, the lover of a trans rock star named Hedwig, in the film Hedwig and the Angry Inch, an adaptation of John Cameron Mitchell's 1998 stage musical. Although not his first film role, Pitt's performance as Gnosis led to a series of supporting roles in many acclaimed and often controversial films, including Larry Clark's Bully (2001), Murder by Numbers (2002), and Funny Games, a 2007 remake of Michael Haneke's 1997 film of the same title. One of Pitt's more notable roles was as the lead in Bernardo Bertolucci's The Dreamers (2003).

Pitt attributes his success in films to a combination of hard work and the presence of "a few angels in my life." He has also stressed that he chooses roles not with the hope that they will garner commercial success or to gain notoriety but to create art, challenge the audience, and ultimately contribute to a project that he is proud of: 
To be honest, I make very controversial films. The films that I've made have been very, very bold choices. As the years go by, I think my work is going to come more and more in context. The truth is that you can't take what people say too seriously. If I cared what people think about my career, I would have not done—just look at my work. Don't look at me, look at what I've done. Every movie that I've picked, from my first film on, has been considered by everyone to be "career suicide." And I have an amazing life. I have an amazing career. I work with artists. But I'm not making Spider-Man.

In 2004, Pitt has also appeared in Asia Argento's Heart Is Deceitful Above All Things and M. Night Shyamalan's The Village and in 2005 starred in Gus Van Sant's Last Days as a rock musician "inspired" by Nirvana frontman, Kurt Cobain. He performed all of the songs, which closely resembled Cobain's guitar and singing styles.

On the set of Last Days, he met Thurston Moore of Sonic Youth, who had been hired by Van Sant to serve as the film's music consultant. The pair formed a close bond, with Moore writing, "[Gus] wanted me to hang out with Michael and talk about his character, and let him be in character. We ended up spending a lot of time together. My daughter Coco still relates to Michael as Blake from Last Days".

In 2006, he starred in the unconventional romantic comedy Delirious as a young homeless man who befriends a celebrity photographer and falls in love with a pop singer. The movie appeared at the Sundance Film Festival. The following year, he played opposite Keira Knightley in Silk, adapted from the novel by Alessandro Baricco, as Hervé Joncour, a French silkworm smuggler, who falls in love with a baron's concubine while in Japan.

In 2014, Pitt juggled two starring roles, as Tommy Uva in the comedic American crime drama Rob the Mob and as a molecular biologist in search of the truth about the origins of the eye in the science fiction romantic drama I Origins.

In 2017, Pitt starred in the film Ghost in the Shell as the villainous hacker Kuze.

Theater
Pitt made his Off-Broadway debut in 1999 in the play The Trestle at Pope Lick Creek at the New York Theatre Workshop.

Television
During his theater debut, a casting agent whom Pitt had mistaken for a police officer attempting to arrest him noticed him and recommended him for a role on the television series Dawson's Creek. He played Henry Parker on a recurring basis in the third season (1999–2000).

In 2010, Pitt was cast as Jimmy Darmody in the HBO series Boardwalk Empire (about the rise of Atlantic City during the Prohibition era), as the protégé of corrupt politician Nucky Thompson. He appeared in the show's first two seasons and was nominated for a Screen Actors Guild Award and a Critics's Choice Award for his performance. Pitt said of Boardwalk Empire, "I'm proud of the work we did on that show. My grandfather was an Italian-American and he met my grandmother in Atlantic City. So Jimmy Darmody spoke to me; he felt very close to home."

In 2014, he was cast in the recurring role of Mason Verger in the NBC series Hannibal playing the role in the show's second season. He subsequently left and was replaced by Joe Anderson.

Music
Pitt sang and played guitar in his band, Pagoda, whose self-titled debut album was released by Universal/Fontana/Ecstatic Peace in 2007.

Under the title Jimi Pitt and the Twins of Evil, Pitt performed "Hey Joe" with the Twins of Evil for The Dreamers soundtrack.

Directing
In January 2015, Pitt made his official directorial debut with a campaign film for fashion label Rag & Bone's Spring 2015 collection. The video features Pitt and prior co-stars actress Astrid Bergès-Frisbey—the new face of Rag & Bone womenswear—and British actor Stephen Graham, from I Origins and Boardwalk Empire, respectively. Says Rag & Bone co-head, Marcus Wainwright, "[Pitt]'s a really talented actor and musician, and he came to us with this concept of doing a film-based campaign. We thought it was awesome and well worth trying." Pitt has also directed a number of music videos for Pagoda.

In 2020, he revealed he had recently directed a film in Italy called Nocturnal, although there is no release date set yet.

Modeling
Pitt has modeled for numerous designer campaigns. In 2012, he was named the face of Italian fashion house Prada and modeled their menswear line. He was also featured in two separate Rag & Bone campaigns prior to the release of his self-directed campaign—once for Fall/Winter 2013, with French actress Léa Seydoux, and once for Fall/Winter 2014, with actress Winona Ryder.

Personal life
In 2005, Pitt revealed that he had been "engaged for a long time now" to model Jamie Bochert and said of her: "She's my other half." The two ended their relationship in 2014. Pitt had previously been engaged to Asia Argento from 2003 to 2004.

In July 2022, Pitt was arrested and charged with assault and petty larceny after allegedly hitting another man multiple times and taking his phone. In September, Pitt was hospitalized and deemed "emotionally disturbed" after being accused of throwing items at people from the rooftop of a building.

Filmography

Film

Television

Music video

References

External links

1981 births
Male actors from New York City
American male film actors
Living people
20th-century American male actors
21st-century American male actors
Male models from New Jersey
American people of English descent
American people of Irish descent
American people of Italian descent
Male actors from New Jersey
People from West Orange, New Jersey
American male stage actors
American male television actors